Reginald Heber Ridgely Jr. (August 18, 1902 – June 28, 1979) was a United States Marine Corps Lieutenant General. He was taken as a prisoner of war by the Japanese during World War II and was one of the few survivors of the infamous "hellships."

Early life and career 
Reginald H. Ridgely was born on August 18, 1902, in Lexington, Virginia. He was raised in Annapolis, Maryland and attended St. John's College, where his father was a professor.

Upon graduating in 1923, Ridgely was commissioned as a second lieutenant in the Marine Corps. He took part in the occupations of Haiti and Nicaragua during the Banana Wars. He also spent time overseas in the Mediterranean before he was attached to the 4th Marine Regiment in Shanghai, China, in June of 1941. In November of that year, the regiment relocated to the Philippines.

World War II 
Just a few weeks after the move, the Japanese attacked Pearl Harbor and invaded the Philippines. Major Ridgely fought with his Marines during the battle of Bataan before evacuating to the island of Corregidor. However they were forced to surrender during the battle of Corregidor on May 6, 1942.

The prisoners were held on Corregidor for the next several weeks, where they were placed on a starvation diet. They also were required to bow to any Japanese soldier they crossed paths with, and would be beaten for various reasons, sometimes for no apparent reason at all. On May 24, the prisoners were loaded onto landing barges and transported to Manila, where they were forced to march in a Japanese "Victory Parade" through the city. Major Ridgely and his fellow prisoners were tightly packed into cattle cars and shipped to a prisoner of war camp at Cabanatuan, where he stayed for the next two years.

Ridgely and 1,600 other prisoners of war were sent by hellships to Japan in December 1944, while the United States was fighting to retake the Philippines. The first ship Ridgely was traveling in, Ōryoku Maru, was sunk just two days after departing Manila Bay by American aircraft. 200 prisoners were killed as Ridgely assumed leadership over the survivors. The prisoners were transferred to a second ship, Enoura Maru, which managed to reach Formosa on New Year's Day 1945. About one week later, that ship was bombed as well and left dead in the water, killing another 300 prisoners.

A third ship, Brazil Maru, delivered Major Ridgely and the surviving prisoners to Japan by the end of January. Ridgely would eventually be taken to Korea, where he spent the rest of the war at a camp in Keijō. He was released just after the Japanese surrender. Only 400 of the original 1,600 prisoners of war loaded on the hellships survived the war.

Post-war career 
Following the war, Ridgely served as the commanding officer of the 8th Marine Regiment & Fleet Force in the Mediterranean from 1947 to 1948. Later, from 1948 to January 1951, he was the commanding officer of the Naval disciplinary barracks at Portsmouth, N.H.  He then served as the commanding general of MCRD San Diego from 1951 to 1952.

In 1952, Ridgely then became director of Marine Corps personnel at headquarters of the U.S.M.C in Washington, D.C. From July 1955 to June 1957, Major General Ridgely was the commanding general of the 2nd Marine Division. Afterwards, he took over as the commanding general of Camp Pendleton, filling this position until his retirement as a lieutenant general on November 1, 1959.

Reginald H. Ridgely died of cardiac arrest on June 28, 1979, in a nursing home in Kilmarnock, Virginia. He was buried in Arlington National Cemetery.

Decorations and awards
Reginald H. Ridgely's military awards include:

See also 
 List of 2nd Marine Division commanders

References 

1902 births
1979 deaths
United States Marine Corps personnel of World War II
American prisoners of war in World War II
Burials at Arlington National Cemetery
Military personnel from Maryland
Military personnel from Virginia
People from Annapolis, Maryland
People from Lexington, Virginia
American military personnel of the Banana Wars
St. John's College (Annapolis/Santa Fe) alumni
United States Marine Corps generals
World War II prisoners of war held by Japan